Lawhorn is a surname. Notable people with the surname include:

Geraldine Lawhorn (1916–2016), American deaf-blind advocate, performer, actress and pianist
JJ Lawhorn (born 1993), American country music singer-songwriter
Joseph Lawhorn, United States Army military chaplain
Sammy Lawhorn (1935–1990), American Chicago blues guitarist